The Q is a multilevel LGBT nightclub in the Hell's Kitchen neighborhood of Manhattan in New York City. Backed by celebrity investors including Billy Porter and Zachary Quinto, the club is billed as "the largest queer-owned and -operated nightlife venue in Manhattan". It is known for its five distinctly themed rooms and for its entertainment selection, which features A-list comedians, prominent local drag queens, burlesque acts and jazz bands. The establishment was originally set to open in 2020, but its debut was pushed to June 2021 due to the COVID-19 pandemic. In June 2022, Frankie Sharp—one of the club's three founding owners—filed a lawsuit against the other two, Alan Picus and Bob Fluet. The Q has garnered praise from critics, who have described it as innovative, inclusive and chic.

Description

Located on Eighth Avenue near 48th Street in the Hell's Kitchen neighborhood of Manhattan in New York City, the Q is a four-story venue containing five distinct clubbing areas. Frankie Sharp, who co-founded the club, stated to Thrillist and Queerty that it is "the largest queer-owned and -operated nightlife venue in Manhattan".

Live music and performances take place on the Q's ground level, which is outfitted with parquet floors, booths and mirrors. The second floor, styled like a lounge, contains a bar and a "'Gentlethem's Club' nestled behind a tufted wall". The top level is an open clubbing space with 20-foot (6.1-meter) ceilings, a suspended catwalk, a high DJ platform and decorative LED screens bearing the venue's emblem. In some areas, the walls are adorned with graffiti, queer movie posters and sexual artwork, including a Tom of Finland mural and a drawing of "a buff Ned Flanders from The Simpsons with protruding nipples".

The establishment hosts a number of weekly drag and music shows, which star "prominent local entertainers like jazz musician Richard Cortez and drag queens Lagoona Bloo, Jasmine Rice Labeija, and Kizha Carr". It also features A-list comedy events, burlesque and go-go dancing.

History

The Q was originally co-owned by Sharp, an event producer and DJ; Bob Fluet, a co-founder of the Boxers NYC bar chain; and Alan Picus, a party promoter. Sharp expressed intentions to open "a multi-floor LGBTQ nightclub... that would redefine the genre" in early 2020, but the onset of the COVID-19 pandemic delayed these plans. The Q's lease had been set to start on March 10 of that year, just days before nonessential businesses in New York were ordered to shutter. Several months later, the building's landlord proposed a "'COVID-friendly' deal" that enabled the venue's co-owners to proceed with construction. Sharp, Fluet and Picus subsequently secured investments from celebrities including Billy Porter, Zachary Quinto, Charlie Carver and Jake Shears.

In a March 2021 interview with Michael Musto, Sharp announced that the club would open as soon as it could feasibly do so under the circumstances of the pandemic. Excitement over the Q's debut drew press attention throughout the spring, with Instinct Michael Cook calling it "one of the most anticipated nightlife openings in recent memory". The club's inaugural party was held on June 25, which coincided with the end of Pride month. The venue sold out a number of high-profile events during its first week. , the establishment required proof of vaccination against COVID-19 for entry.

Lawsuit
On June 10, 2022, Sharp—who had divested from the Q—filed a lawsuit against Picus and Fluet for "breach of contract, breach of fiduciary duty, fraud, unjust enrichment and accounting". The court filings include claims that Sharp's employment contract was violated, that Picus instructed Q security to not check patron IDs and to allow drugs inside the venue, and that Picus made racist and transphobic statements, such as: "I don't need to break my back to hire people just because they're black and trans," and "Make sure [the club's] Latin nights are the good kind of Latins. Not Blatinos," referring to dark-skinned Latinx people.

In July 2022, Instinct reached out to Sharp, Fluet and Picus for comment. Picus did not respond, Sharp replied that he had no comment, and Fluet said:  On July 5, Fluet announced via the Q's Instagram profile that Luis Fernando, the club's creative director, would replace Picus as its executive producer.

Drugging incidents
In November 2022, local and international media reported that a 33-year-old man died under suspicious circumstances after leaving the Q on Memorial Day weekend. A toxicology report suggested that he died of a drug overdose, and the police investigation found that "[h]is phone and credit cards were stolen and more than $25,000 was drained from his bank account." The New York City Police Department is investigating a possible connection between this incident and more than a dozen others involving drugging and robbery of local gay men, including one in April 2022 in which a 25-year-old man was drugged, robbed and subsequently found dead after leaving the Ritz, another Hell's Kitchen gay club. EDGE Media Network reported that another parent came forward about their son being drugged and robbed after leaving the Q in early April 2022, though that man survived. The press has referred to the suspected group of perpetrators of these attacks as the "roofie robbers".

Reception

Kyler Alvord of Thrillist called the Q "a game-changing queer venue that caters to every interest", remarking that it "brings four floors of old-school grit and glam to Manhattan's queer nightlife scene". He further commented: "While the Q revives some of the grit and allure synonymous with classic NYC gay clubs, it arrives with an added emphasis on respect and inclusion."

A July 2021 Travel Gay review said the establishment was "set to become one of the biggest gay destinations in New York". After attending the Q's opening weekend events, Musto dubbed it "[a] giddy Bloomingdale's of gay chic".  Insider Moises Mendez II wrote that "each floor [has] a different vibe from the last, and as you make your way up the stairs, each space became even more energetic and vibrant".

See also

 Impact of the COVID-19 pandemic on the LGBT community
 LGBT culture in New York City
 List of nightclubs in New York City

Notes

References

External links

 

2021 establishments in New York City
Hell's Kitchen, Manhattan
Impact of the COVID-19 pandemic on the LGBT community
LGBT drinking establishments in New York City
LGBT nightclubs in New York (state)
Nightclubs in Manhattan